La Gomera Airport  is an airport located near the town of Playa Santiago on the island of La Gomera in the Canary Islands,  southwest by road from the island's capital city, San Sebastián de la Gomera.

Although the runway was completed in 1994, the terminal did not open until 1999. As of August 2019, there are two return flights per day to Tenerife North and two return flights per day to Gran Canaria.

Although  from the island capital, the airport was located here to avoid disturbing the Garajonay National Park and avoid the cloudier and foggier climate to the North of the island, whilst the volcanic terrain gives few suitable sites anywhere on La Gomera, although even this site required extensive embankments at both ends of the runway.

History
Aviation in the island of La Gomera started in the 1950s, when a private airfield was constructed. Its name was "El Revolcadero" and it was situated on a hill west of the new airport, GPS 28.023443,-17.242084.

This airfield had a runway (09-27), an hangar and a small stand which was used as control tower.  The airfield was for the owner's private use and for cargo and fumigation works.

In 1962, the island had a lot of sanitary assistance problems, so studies to build an airport in the island were started, but this project was not carried out until 1975. However, due to the opening of the Tenerife South Airport and a new maritime line with the island, the project was again delayed.

Finally, in the 1980s, problems with wounded snake-bite evacuations necessitated building an airport in the island, and on 27 July 1987, an agreement for the construction of the airport was signed.

At the end of 1994 the airfield had a runway (09-27), an aircraft parking and a taxi way to the runway. The elected place to build the installations was the "Meseta de los Acantilados" (Plateau Cliffs), which is located 2 kilometers from the old airfield of "El Revolcadero".

At the end of 1991, when Aeropuertos Españoles y Navegación Aérea (AENA), literally "Spanish Airports and Air Navigation", took over the airport, a passenger terminal was built, which was inaugurated in 1992. This passenger terminal has two floors and we can see in it the typical canarian architecture.

Airlines and destinations

Statistics
In the next chart, the evolution of passengers traffic by year is indicated.

References

External links 
La Gomera Airport (official site) 
 Information about La Gomera Airport in World Aero Data
 Meteorological and air navigation information about La Gomera Airport in Global Gazetteer Version 2.2
 La Gomera Airport in AZ World airports

Airports in the Canary Islands
La Gomera
Airports established in 1994
1994 establishments in Spain